Calabash is a small fishing town in Brunswick County, North Carolina, United States. The population was 1,786 at the 2010 census, up from 711 in  2000. It prides itself on being known as the "Seafood Capital of the World" because of the town's seafood restaurants.

Calabash is part of the Myrtle Beach metropolitan area.

Geography
Calabash is located in southwestern Brunswick County at  (33.892619, -78.566547). Its southwest border is the South Carolina state line. It is bordered to the northwest by the town of Carolina Shores, and the town of Sunset Beach lies to the east.

The main road through the town is North Carolina Highway 179 (Beach Drive), leading west to U.S. Route 17 in South Carolina and east by a winding route  to Shallotte.

History
Calabash was named after the gourds that grew in the region, which were used for drinking well water. Since the 1930s, Calabash has been known for its distinctive style of fried seafood, which has come to be known as "Calabash Style." Calabash style buffets are common in many eastern Carolina coastal towns. Myrtle Beach, South Carolina, is home to a large number of these restaurants, as the city is just  from Calabash.

In 1998, a large portion of the town of Calabash split to form the town of Carolina Shores. The split came as the result of years of bickering over "sewer, garbage collection and sign restrictions". The town limits of Carolina Shores currently interlock with those of Calabash.

The present Town Hall is located at 882 Persimmon Road SW. The town's emergency services serve the communities of Calabash, Sunset Beach, and Carolina Shores.

Demographics

2020 census

As of the 2020 United States census, there were 2,011 people, 812 households, and 415 families residing in the town.

2000 census
As of the census of 2000, there were 711 people, 377 households, and 232 families residing in the town. The population density was 501.5 people per square mile (193.3/km2). There were 508 housing units at an average density of 358.3 per square mile (138.1/km2). The racial makeup of the town was 93.25% White, 3.66% African American, 0.14% Asian, 2.25% from other races, and 0.70% from two or more races. Hispanic or Latino of any race were 3.66% of the population.

There were 377 households, out of which 11.4% had children under the age of 18 living with them, 52.5% were married couples living together, 6.4% had a female householder with no husband present, and 38.2% were non-traditional families (needs definition). 34.2% of all households were made up of individuals, and 16.7% had someone living alone who was 65 years of age or older. The average household size was 1.89 and the average family size was 2.32.

In the town, the population was spread out, with 9.7% under the age of 18, 4.5% from 18 to 24, 19.4% from 25 to 44, 29.7% from 45 to 64, and 36.7% who were 65 years of age or older. The median age was 58 years. For every 100 females, there were 93.2 males. For every 100 females age 18 and over, there were 94.5 males.

The median income for a household in the town was $32,946, and the median income for a family was $38,403. Males had a median income of $27,202 versus $25,368 for females. The per capita income for the town was $22,975. About 5.4% of families and 9.3% of the population were below the poverty line, including 11.8% of those under age 18 and 1.3% of those age 65 or over.

References

External links

Town of Calabash official website 
Calabash Fire Department

Towns in North Carolina
Towns in Brunswick County, North Carolina
Cape Fear (region)